Jeon Woo-chi (14?? ~ 15??) was a Taoist scholar during the Joseon dynasty of Korea. He is known by many as the most prominent "sorcerer" in Korean history, and a representative trickster from old Korean literature. His pen name was Woosa, which means "featherman". Though he was a Taoist heretic, he studied Confucianism under Seo Gyeong-deok.

Stories about his life
According to the Complete Works from Azure Residence by Yi Deok-moo, when Jeon was very young, he went to a mountain temple to study in solitude. One day, the rice wine which was brewed at the temple vanished. The monks scolded Jeon, accusing him of drinking it. Jeon was aggrieved and upset, so he decided to hunt down the true culprit. He waited beside the wine jugs until twilight. At dusk, a nine-tailed fox came out from the forest and drank the wine until she was drunk. Jeon jumped out and tied her up with some rope. The fox offered him her grimoire if he would release her. Jeon accepted that and became a sorcerer through studying the fox's grimoire.

In another version of the story from one the Ilsamungo-version of the Tale of Jeon Woo-chi, young Jeon and a fox (who was shaped like a woman) loved each other. One day while they kissed each other, the fox's magical marble went into Jeon's mouth, and he swallowed it. Then she, abashed, ran away and he absorbed the marble's power, becoming a sorcerer.

According to the Unofficial History of the East Land, one day between 1522 and 1566, Yi Gil's farm (which is in today's Bupyeong District) was suffering from an epidemic, and Yi's serfs and neighbors were ill in bed. Then Jeon visited Yi and expelled a disease.

Death
As he was Taoist heretic, if not anarchistic, there are some legends that Jeon opposed the Joseon dynastic government and the king. By one account, he ended up with being arrested and put to death by execution. Some time later, Cha Sick, who was Jeon's alumnus under Seo Gyeong-deok, was visited by Jeon. Jeon borrowed Cha Anthology of Du Fu and went away. Cha had known nothing about Jeon's death, so he talked about this to other alumni. Surprised, they dig up Jeon's tomb and opened the coffin to find there was no body.

Popular culture 
 Portrayed by Kang Dong-won in the 2009 film Jeon Woo-chi: The Taoist Wizard.
 Portrayed by Cha Tae-hyun in the 2012-2013 KBS2 TV series Jeon Woo-chi.
 Portrayed by Lee Se-chang in the 2016 MBC TV series The Flower in Prison.

References 

15th-century Korean people
16th-century Korean people
15th-century births
16th-century deaths
Korean Taoists
Tricksters